Lâm Văn Hoành (born 19 August 1963) is a Vietnamese swimmer. He competed in the men's 100 metre backstroke at the 1980 Summer Olympics.

References

External links
 

1963 births
Living people
Vietnamese male swimmers
Olympic swimmers of Vietnam
Swimmers at the 1980 Summer Olympics
Place of birth missing (living people)